is a former Japanese football player.

Playing career
Matsubara was born in Kyoto Prefecture on November 15, 1973. After graduating from Ritsumeikan University, he joined J1 League club Shimizu S-Pulse in 1996. On March 16, he debuted against Kashima Antlers in opening match in 1996 season. However he played only 2 matches and retired end of 1996 season.

Club statistics

References

External links

geocities.jp

1973 births
Living people
Ritsumeikan University alumni
Association football people from Kyoto Prefecture
Japanese footballers
J1 League players
Shimizu S-Pulse players
Association football forwards